Alonzo Butler (born October 30, 1979) is an American heavyweight boxer.

Professional record

|-
|align="center" colspan=8|35 fights, 30 wins (23 knockouts), 3 losses (0 knockouts), 1 draw
|-
|align=center style="border-style: none none solid solid; background: #e3e3e3"|Result
|align=center style="border-style: none none solid solid; background: #e3e3e3"|Record
|align=center style="border-style: none none solid solid; background: #e3e3e3"|Opponent
|align=center style="border-style: none none solid solid; background: #e3e3e3"|Type
|align=center style="border-style: none none solid solid; background: #e3e3e3"|Round, time
|align=center style="border-style: none none solid solid; background: #e3e3e3"|Date
|align=center style="border-style: none none solid solid; background: #e3e3e3"|Location
|align=center style="border-style: none none solid solid; background: #e3e3e3"|Notes
|- align=center
|Win
|31-3-1 (1)
|align=left| Roberto White
|
|
|
|align=left|
|align=left|
|- align=center
|Win
|30–3–1 (1)
|align=left| Marvin Hunt
|
|
|
|align=left|
|align=left|
|- align=center
|Loss
|29–3–1 (1)
|align=left| Brice Ritani Coe
| 
|
|
|align=left|
|align=left|
|- align=center
|Win
|29–2–1 (1)
|align=left| Louis Monaco
|
|
|
|align=left|
|align=left|
|-align=center
|Loss
|28–2–1 (1)
|align=left| Travis Walker
|
|
|
|align=left|
|align=left|
|-align=center
|Win
|28–1–1 (1)
|align=left| Willie Perryman
|
|
|
|align=left|
|align=left|
|-align=center
|Win
|27–1–1 (1)
|align=left| Douglas Robertson
|
|
|
|align=left|
|align=left|
|-align=center
|Loss
|26–1–1 (1)
|align=left| Friday Ahunanya
|
|
|
|align=left|
|align=left|
|-align=center
|Win
|26–0–1 (1)
|align=left| Ralph West
|
|
|
|align=left|
|align=left|
|-align=center
|Win
|25–0–1 (1)
|align=left| James Walton
|
|
|
|align=left|
|align=left|
|-align=center
|style="background:#ddd;"|NC
|24–0–1 (1)
|align=left| Troy Beets
|
|
|
|align=left|
|align=left|
|-align=center
|Win
|24–0–1
|align=left| Maurice Wheeler
|
|
|
|align=left|
|align=left|
|-align=center
|Win
|23–0–1
|align=left| Travis Fulton
|
|
|
|align=left|
|align=left|
|-align=center
|Win
|22–0–1
|align=left| Zack Page
|
|
|
|align=left|
|align=left|
|-align=center
|Win
|21–0–1
|align=left| Terry Porter
|
|
|
|align=left|
|align=left|
|-align=center
|Win
|20–0–1
|align=left| Cornelius Ellis
|
|
|
|align=left|
|align=left|
|- align=center
|Win
|19-0-1
|align=left| Andrew Greeley
|
|
|
|align=left|
|align=left|
|- align=center
|Win
|18-0-1
|align=left| Demetrice King
|
|
|
|align=left|
|align=left|
|- align=center
|Win
|17-0-1
|align=left| Brandon Cabell
|
|
|
|align=left|
|align=left|

References

External links
 

Boxers from Tennessee
1979 births
Living people
Sportspeople from Chattanooga, Tennessee
Sportspeople from Nashville, Tennessee
American male boxers
Heavyweight boxers